Choi Kwon is a South Korean actor. He is best known for his roles as an aspiring dancer in Over the Rainbow (2006), and a North Korean soldier in The King 2 Hearts (2012).

Filmography

Television series

Film

Theater

References

External links
 
 Choi Kwon at Sim Entertainment 
 
 
 

1981 births
Living people
21st-century South Korean male actors
Male actors from Seoul
South Korean male film actors
South Korean male television actors
South Korean male stage actors
South Korean male musical theatre actors